Jacinta Balbela (September 29, 1919 – October 26, 2007) was an Uruguayan judge.

Background
Born in Salto, she obtained her degree as a lawyer in 1945, and in 1952 she was appointed as a judge. She served in many towns of the country, and later as a criminal judge in Montevideo.

Judicial appointments
In 1973 she became a member of a Court of Appeal with criminal jurisdiction. Twelve years later, in May 1985, she was appointed a member of the  Supreme Court of Justice, where she remained until September 1989, when she retired because she had reached the age of 70.

Later roles
After her retirement from the courts, she served as the co-director of the United Nations Latin American Institute for the Prevention of Crime and the Treatment of Offenders (ILANUD) in San José, Costa Rica.

She also wrote numerous articles about Criminal Law, Family Law and Human Rights. She died in Montevideo.

She died in October 2007. Her remains are buried at Cementerio del Norte, Montevideo.

Publications
 Código de la Infancia y la Adolescencia, comentado y anotado (with Ricardo Pérez Manrique)

References

1919 births
2007 deaths
People from Salto, Uruguay
Uruguayan judges
Uruguayan women jurists
Supreme Court of Uruguay justices
Uruguayan people of Spanish descent
Burials at the Cementerio del Norte, Montevideo